is an air base located in Betsukai, Notsuke District, Hokkaido Prefecture, Japan.

References

Japan Air Self-Defense Force bases